This is a list of notable past and present residents of the U.S. city of Winston-Salem, North Carolina, and its surrounding metropolitan area.

Athletics

Dustin Ackley, outfielder for the New York Yankees
Ray Agnew III, NFL player
Hubbard Alexander, football coach
Kathleen Baker, Olympic gold and silver medalist swimmer
Dillon Bassett, NASCAR driver
Ronnie Bassett Jr., NASCAR driver
Tanner Beason, Major League Soccer (MLS) player
Ed Berrier, NASCAR driver
Don Cardwell, former Major League Baseball pitcher
Randolph Childress, former professional basketball player
Richard Childress, NASCAR team owner
Sam Cronin, former Major League Soccer player
Alvin Crowder, MLB All-Star pitcher
Hubert Davis, head coach of the men's basketball team at University of North Carolina at Chapel Hill, basketball analyst for ESPN, former University of North Carolina at Chapel Hill and NBA player
Carl Eller, NFL defensive end, College Football Hall of Fame and Pro Football Hall of Fame member 
C.E. "Big House" Gaines, head basketball coach of Winston-Salem State University for 47 years; member of Basketball Hall of Fame
Ed Gainey, Canadian Football League player 
Harry Giles, 20th pick in the 2017 NBA Draft, current NBA player for the Portland Trail Blazers.
Danny Gathings, retired basketball player
Harvey Gentry, former Major League Baseball player
Rufe Gentry, former Major League Baseball player for the Detroit Tigers
Mark Grace, first baseman for Chicago Cubs and Arizona Diamondbacks, broadcaster and coach
Tommy Gregg, former Major League Baseball player
Jerry Haas, retired professional golfer
Chris Hairston, NFL offensive lineman
Happy Hairston, former NBA player for Los Angeles Lakers; NBA Champion
 C. J. Harris, basketball player in the Israeli Basketball Premier League
Josh Hawkins, NFL cornerback
Madison Hedgecock, NFL fullback
Ricky Hickman, professional basketball player
Josh Howard, NBA player
Othello Hunter, professional basketball player in the Israeli Basketball Premier League
Marc Johnson, professional skateboarder
Randy Jones, Olympic bobsledder, winning a silver medal in the four-man event
Rusty LaRue, NBA player and NCAA record holder in football 
Anthony Levine, NFL safety and two-time Super Bowl champion
Camille Little, WNBA player
Caleb Martin (basketball), NBA player for the Miami Heat
Brian McDonough, Olympic cyclist
Wilmer "Vinegar Bend" Mizell, MLB pitcher for Pirates and Cardinals, and US congressman from 1968–74
Earl Monroe, NBA player for New York Knicks and Baltimore Bullets
Patrick O'Sullivan, NHL player
Arnold Palmer, former professional golfer, attended Wake Forest University
Chris Paul, NBA player for the Phoenix Suns
Juvonte Reddic (born 1992), basketball player in the Israeli Basketball Premier League
J-Mee Samuels, track and field sprinter
Ernie Shore, former Major League Baseball pitcher and sheriff of Forsyth County, North Carolina
Ben Smith, NHL player and 2013 Stanley Cup champion
Ramondo Stallings, NFL player
Ryan Taylor, former NFL tight end for the Green Bay Packers
Reyshawn Terry, professional basketball player and 2005 NCAA champion with UNC
Eric Wallace (professional athlete), 3 sport professional athlete. Ruckman/Forward for the North Melbourne Football Club; NFL player for the Carolina Panthers.

Government, politics, and military

Hannah Atkins, member of the Oklahoma House of Representatives from 1968 to 1980, and the first African-American woman elected to it
Jim Broyhill, Republican politician; served North Carolina in both U.S. House of Representatives and Senate
Ted Budd, United States Representative and United States Senator-elect from North Carolina 
Richard Burr, United States Senator
Irving E. Carlyle, North Carolina lawyer and state leader
Daryl L. Caudle, Admiral, Commander, U.S. Fleet Forces Command
Larken Egleston, Charlotte, North Carolina City Councilmember
Gordon Gray, newspaper publisher, Secretary of the Army under President Truman, and President Eisenhower's National Security Advisor
William Heaton, former chief of staff to Bob Ney
Lawrence Joel, United States Army soldier; received Medal of Honor during the Vietnam War
Henry Johnson, United States Army soldier; posthumously awarded the Medal of Honor for his actions in World War I
Norman M. Miller, United States Navy officer; one of the most decorated Naval Aviators during World War II
Ray C. Osborne, served as the first Lieutenant Governor of Florida under the state constitution of 1968
Bennetta Bullock Washington, "first first lady" of Washington, D.C., director of Job Corps for Women at Department of Labor
Togo West, United States Secretary of Veterans Affairs, United States Secretary of the Army, General Counsel of the Navy

Literature

Maya Angelou, poet
Bekah Brunstetter, playwright
Gary Chapman, author
Clement Eaton, historian and writer
John Ehle, author
Emily V. Gordon, writer, producer, and podcast host
Charlie Lovett, New York Times best selling novelist and expert on both the works and life of Lewis Carroll
T. R. Pearson, author of A Short History of a Small Place
James Norwood Pratt, author on topics of tea and tea lore
Riley Redgate, author of young adult fiction

Movies, television, and media

Angela Bassett, actress
Jerrod Carmichael, stand-up comedian, actor, and writer
Howard Cosell, sportscaster 
Carter Covington, television show creator, writer, story editor and producer
Jennifer Ehle, British-American actress
Mary Garber, sports journalist
Kathryn Grayson, actress and operatic soprano singer
Pam Grier, actress
Julianna Guill, actress
Rosemary Harris, actress; Golden Globe, Emmy and Tony Award winner
Jackée Harry, actress and comedian
Burgess Jenkins, actor
Tom Kent, nationally syndicated radio personality
Angus MacLachlan, screenwriter
Rusty Mills, Emmy-winning animator and director
Cullen Moss, actor
Harold Nicholas, dancer, entertainer 
Melissa Harris-Perry, journalist, political commentator, author
Stuart Scott, sportscaster 
Stephen A. Smith, sports journalist, Winston-Salem State University alum, radio host, analyst for ESPN First Take
Tab Thacker, actor and NCAA wrestling national champion at NC State
Jill Wagner, actress and TV host
Rolonda Watts, television personality and actress
Colleen Williams, News anchor with KNBC in Los Angeles
Danny McBride, actor, NCSA 94-96
Jada Pinkett Smith, actor, wife of Will Smith, attended NCSA  
Geno Segers, actor, graduated from East Forsyth 
Sharon H. Porter, Ed.D., interview host, author, graduated from Carver High School

Music and arts

9th Wonder, Grammy award-winning hip-hop producer
B.o.B., hip-hop artist
Eleanor Layfield Davis, artist
Mitch Easter, musician and record producer
Ben Folds, singer-songwriter
George Hamilton IV, country singer
Mabel Hampton, dancer during the Harlem Renaissance, lesbian activist, and philanthropist
Byron Hill, songwriter 
Peter Holsapple, singer-songwriter
Chris Murrell, singer and former lead vocalist of the Count Basie Orchestra
Clarence Paul, songwriter and record producer
Kathryn Reynolds, photographer
Chris Stamey, musician, singer, songwriter, and record producer
Becca Stevens, singer, songwriter, and guitarist

Miscellaneous

Jack O. Bovender Jr., former chairman and CEO of HCA Healthcare from 2002 to 2009
Elizabeth Campbell, public television executive
Stuart Epperson, chairman of Salem Communications Corporation
Peaches Golding, appointed by HM Queen Elizabeth II as High Sheriff of Bristol 2010–2011, becoming the first black female and second only black High Sheriff in over 1,000 years;  awarded the OBE by HM Queen Elizabeth II for services to minority ethnic people in the Southwest 
Nia Franklin, Miss America 2019
John Wesley Hanes, founder of Hanes clothing brand
Phil Hanes, businessman, conservationist, and patron of the arts
Frank L. Horton, museum director and antiques dealer
Jacquelyne Jackson, sociologist and academic
R.J. Reynolds, founder of R. J. Reynolds Tobacco Company
Vernon Rudolph, founder of Krispy Kreme Doughnuts
Florence Wells Slater, entomologist and schoolteacher

References

Winston-Salem
Winston-Salem, North Carolina